The champions league round was the next stage from the regional stage of 2019 Thai League 4. The winners and runners-ups of each regions would qualified to this round to finding 4 clubs promoting to 2020 Thai League 3.

Teams

Note:

Group stage

Upper region

Lower region

Knockout stage
Winners, runners-up, third place, and fourth place of 2019 Thai League 4 would promoted to 2020 Thai League 3.

Third place play-off

Summary

|}

Matches

Muang Loei United won 7–3 on aggregate.

Final

Summary

|}

Matches

2–2 on aggregate. Wat Bot City won 6–5 on penalties.

Teams promoted to 2020 Thai League 3

 Wat Bot City (champions)
 Pattani (runners-up)
 Muang Loei United (Third-placed)
 Pathumthani University (Fourth-placed)

References

Thai League T4 seasons
4